De 4 Årstider I Nordvest (Danish for "The 4 Seasons In Northwest") is the Danish Heavy metal band Red Warszawa's sixth studio album. The album is under titled "Gretes Tits 1986-2010".

Track listing
 "Sut Den Onde Numse" (Teat The Evil Butt) 
 "De 4 Årstider I Nordvest" (The 4 Seasons In Nordvest)
 "Karry" (Curry)
 "Gratis Pikkemand" (Free Pecker)
 "Rapanden Rasmus" (The Rapduck Rasmus)
 "Stram Dressur" (Tight Dressage)
 "Vi Er Generation Der Ikke Må Heile" (We Are the Generation Which May Not Hail)
 "Benzin I Blodet" (Gasoline In the Blood)
 "Skimlers Liste" (Skimlers List)
 "Brøndby Strand" (Broendby Beach)
 "Spil Den Med Satan" (Play the One With Satan)
 "Drikke Rikke" (Drinking Rikke)
 "Jarmers Plads" (Jarmers Place)
 "Osama Har Vundet" (Osama Has Won)
 "Vågn Op" (Wake Up)
 "Begravelsesforretningen" (The Funeral Store)
 "Homometeret" (The Homo-O-meter)

Trivia
The under title "Gretes Tits" is a Danish joke. The other albums Red Warszawa has made are under titled "Greatest Hits". In Danish, Grete is a name.

Personnel
"Lækre" Jens Mondrup - "Vocals" 
"Heavy" Henning Nymand - Guitar, Bass, Producer
Morten "Måtten Møbelbanker" Nielsen - Drums

References

2010 albums
Red Warszawa albums